The Izvor is a left tributary of the river Jiu in Romania. It flows into the Jiu south of the city Petroșani.

References

Rivers of Romania
Rivers of Hunedoara County